Petar Vitezica was a Yugoslav politician and Mayor of Split during World War II.

Mayors of Split, Croatia
Year of birth missing
Year of death missing